Phillip Gardiner (born 1952) is an Australian former lightweight rower. He was an eight-time Australian national champion and won two bronze medals at World Rowing Championships. He made ten appearances for Australia at World Rowing Championships over the seventeen-year period from 1977 to 1994.

Club and state rowing
Gardiner was raised in Sydney and took up rowing as a coxswain in 1961 at the Glebe Rowing Club. He coxed a Glebe men's junior four at the 1970 Australian Rowing Championships.

Gardiner relocated to Melbourne and joined the Melbourne University Boat Club in 1977 in an effort to make the Australian lightweight eight. In Melbourne Uni colours he contested and won the national lightweight eight title twice at the Australian Rowing Championships in 1981 and 1985.

In 1979 he first made state selection for Victoria in the men's lightweight four which contested and won the Penrith Cup at the Interstate Regatta within the Australian Rowing Championships. He raced in further Penrith Cup fours for Victoria in 1980, 1984, 1985, 1986, 1987, 1988, 1990 and 1992 always in the bow seat. He saw victories in those crews in 1979, 1984, 1985, 1986, 1988 and 1990.

International representative rowing
Gardiner made his Australian representative debut at the 1977 World Rowing Championships in Amsterdam in the Australian lightweight eight which won a bronze medal. The following year at the 1978 World Rowing Championships in Copenhagen he was again in the lightweight eight for another bronze.

He made the Australian men's lightweight eight on four further occasions and raced in that boat at Bled 1979, Montreal 1984, Hazewinkel 1985 and Lake Barrington 1990. He contested the 1981 World Rowing Championships in a lightweight double scull, the 1992 World Rowing Championships in Australia's lightweight four and the 1994 World Rowing Championships in a lightweight pair.

Rowing palmares
 1981 National Championships Men's Lightweight Eight bow - First
 1985 National Championships Men's Lightweight Four bow – First
 1977 – Interstate Men's Lightweight Four Championship emergency
 1979 – Interstate Men's Lightweight Four Championship bow - First
 1980 – Interstate Men's Lightweight Four Championship bow - Third
 1983 – Interstate Men's Lightweight Four Championship emergency
 1984 – Interstate Men's Lightweight Four Championship bow - First
 1985 – Interstate Men's Lightweight Four Championship bow – First
 1986 – Interstate Men's Lightweight Four Championship bow - First
 1987 – Interstate Men's Lightweight Four Championship bow - Second
 1988 – Interstate Men's Lightweight Four Championship bow - First
 1990 – Interstate Men's Lightweight Four Championship bow - First
 1992 – Interstate Men's Lightweight Four Championship bow - Second
 1977 World Rowing Championships – Men's Lightweight Eight bow – Bronze
 1978 World Rowing Championships – Men's Lightweight Eight three seat – Bronze
 1979 World Rowing Championships – Men's Lightweight Eight bow – Sixth
 1980 World Rowing Championships – Men's Lightweight Four reserve
 1981 World Rowing Championships – Men's Lightweight Double Scull bow – Eleventh
 1984 World Rowing Championships – Men's Lightweight Eight bow – Tenth
 1985 World Rowing Championships – Men's Lightweight Eight two seat – Fifth
 1990 World Rowing Championships – Men's Lightweight Eight bow – Fifth
 1992 World Rowing Championships – Men's Lightweight Four bow – Eighth
 1994 World Rowing Championships – Men's Lightweight Pair bow - Eighth

References

  

Australian male rowers
Living people
World Rowing Championships medalists for Australia
1952 births
20th-century Australian people